Alix, Dowager Princess Napoléon (née de Foresta; born 4 April 1926) is the widow of Louis, Prince Napoléon, the disputed head of the House of Bonaparte, and pretender to the Imperial throne of France from their marriage in 1949 until his death in 1997. Bonapartists regarded her as "Empress of the French" for almost fifty years of the 20th century.

Life
She was the daughter of comte Albéric de Foresta and his wife Geneviève Fredet.  Although she was the only consort of the surviving Imperial line not born a princess, her family had been nobles in Lombardy since the 13th century, becoming counts palatine in 1330, constables of Venice in 1425, then retainers of the powerful Doria family in Genoa. They settled in Provence, France early in the 16th century, where they acquired twenty-two manors and the title of marquis by 1651. The Forestas distinguished themselves during the French Restoration as courtiers loyal to the House of Bourbon, and to Henri, comte de Chambord in particular. Long established as squires of large estates and rice paddies in the Camargue, the Forestas often welcomed Charles and his siblings there while they were growing up.

In 1961, about "200 girls from the United States and other countries" paraded "through the halls of the Palace of Versailles...to curtsey before Princess Alix Napoleon, wife of the great-grandnephew of Napoleon Bonaparte."

In 1976, she went to the Iranian Embassy for the Shah's birthday, being described at that time in the press as "one of the two most royal ladies of France -- Princess Napoleon Bonaparte, the elegant, lovely-looking Alix..."

She was an honorary member of The Napoleonic Society of America (1983–2006), which later merged with The Napoleonic Alliance to form The Napoleonic Historical Society in 2006.  More recently, she also gave Havana's Napoleonic Museum "part of a porcelain dinner service presented by Napoleon Bonaparte to his brother Jerome on his wedding day."

Marriage and issue

Louis, Prince Napoléon married Alix de Foresta on 16 August 1949 at Linières-Bouton, France.  They had four children:
 Prince Charles Marie Jérôme Victor (b. 19 October 1950) who claims headship of the House of Bonaparte and the title, "Le Prince Napoléon".
 Princess Catherine Elisabeth Albérique Marie (b. 19 October 1950), who wed firstly on 4 June 1974, Nicolò San Martino d'Agliè dei marchesi di Fontaneto e San Germano (b. 3 July 1948) in Prangins, Switzerland, and divorced in 1982 without issue. She wed secondly on 22 October 1982, Jean-Claude Dualé (3 November 1936 in Medjez-el-Bab, Tunisia – 2017) in Paris, France, and had two children:
 Charlotte Laure Laëtitia Dualé (b. 13 October 1982)
 Marion Josée Alix Dualé (b. 29 March 1985)
 Princess Laure Clémentine Geneviève Bonaparte (b. 8 October 1952 in Paris) married on 23 December 1982, Jean-Claude Lecomte (15 March 1948 in Ax-les-Thermes, France – 2009) and had a son:
Clément Louis Lecomte (b. 7 July 1995)
 Prince Jérôme Xavier Marie Joseph Victor (b. 14 January 1957) married on 2 September 2013, Licia Innocenti (b. 27 April 1965 in Baden, Aargau, Switzerland)

References

External links
Photograph of Alix and the Empress of Persia

House of Bonaparte
Princesses of France (Bonaparte)
1926 births
Living people